Rosamund Clifford (before 1150 – ), often called "The Fair Rosamund" or "Rose of the World" (Latin: rosa mundi), was a medieval English noblewoman and mistress of Henry II, King of England, who became famous in English folklore.

Life

Early life 

Rosamund Clifford, born before 1150, is usually assumed to have been the daughter of Walter de Clifford (born Walter FitzRichard; 1113–1190), a Marcher Lord, and his wife Margaret. He gained his surname from his major holding, Clifford Castle in Herefordshire, where he was first steward then lord. She had three brothers, Walter (circa 1160–1221), Richard and Gilbert, and two sisters: Amice, who married Osbern FitzHugh of Richard's Castle, Herefordshire and Lucy, wife of Hugh de Say of Stokesay, Shropshire. Her name likely came from the Latin phrase rosa mundi, meaning "rose of the world." 

Clifford was first raised at her father's Clifford Castle, then sent to a convent of Benedictine nuns in Godstow Abbey for education.

Henry II's mistress 
Clifford was reputed as one of the greatest beauties of the 12th century. Her relationship with Henry II, King of England (1133–1189) supposedly started when his wife, Queen Eleanor (circa 1122 – 1204) was pregnant with their last child, John (1166–1216) in 1166, but the king publicly acknowledged the affair for the first time in 1174. The queen is thought to have given birth to John in Beaumount Palace instead of Woodstock Palace because Clifford lived at Woodstock. Accounts differ on whether Clifford stayed in Woodstock while the king was travelling between England and his continental lands or accompanied him. If she did not go with him, they could not have spent more than about a quarter of the time between 1166 and 1176 together.

Later life and death 
When her relationship with the king ended, Rosamund retired to Godstow Abbey. She died there around 1176, before the age of 30, and she was buried there. Her death was commemorated at Hereford Cathedral on 6 July, the same day on which Henry II died 13 years after her. The king and the Clifford family paid for her tomb to be cared for by the Benedictine nuns of the convent. Her resting place became a popular shrine among locals, which was noticed by Hugh of Lincoln, the Bishop of Lincoln in 1191. Seeing the flowers and candles that covered the tomb, he ordered her remains to be moved and buried outside, "with the rest, that the Christian religion may not grow into contempt, and that other women, warned by her example, may abstain from illicit and adulterous intercourse". Complying with the bishop's request, Clifford's body was moved to the cemetery by the nuns' chapter house and was destroyed during the Dissolution of the monasteries (1536–1541) under Henry VIII. The ruins of the abbey still stand and are open to the public.

Paul Hentzner, a German traveller who visited England around 1599, recorded that her faded tombstone inscription read in part:

"(...) Adorent (...) utque tibi detur requies Rosamunda precamur ("Let them adore... and we pray that rest be given to you, Rosamund"), followed by a rhyming epitaph: "Hic jacet in tumba Rosamundi non Rosamunda, non redolet sed olet, quae redolere solet ("Here in the tomb lies the rose of the world, not a pure rose; she who used to smell sweet, still smells—but not sweet"). Accounts from the time of its destruction report that, along with other engravings, the tomb contained the depiction of a chalice.

In folklore
In English folklore, Rosamund's legend states that the king did everything to hide his affair from his wife, Queen Eleanor (circa 1122 –  1204). He saw Rosamund only in the middle of a complicated underground labyrinth in the park of Woodstock Palace in Oxfordshire. Following rumours, the queen made her way through the labyrinth and confronted her rival, forcing her to choose between a dagger and a bowl of poison; Rosamund chose the latter and died. Contemporary chronicler John Brompton did not recount this incident in his account of the events, and it first appeared in the 14th century French Chronicle of London.

Another version tells that Rosamund was roasted between two fires, stabbed, and left to bleed to death in a bath of scalding water by the queen. During the Elizabethan era, such stories gained popularity, leading to the writing of the Ballad of Fair Rosamund by Thomas Deloney (1612) and the Complaint of Rosamund by Samuel Daniel (1592), both being purely fictional. The underground labyrinth was added to the tale in 1516 (although Robert Gambles cites a 1231 reference to "Rosamund's chamber", with gardens, a cloister and a well), drawing on the story of Estrildis, mistress of king Locrinus, who had underground apartments built to hide her from his wife. The cup of poison first appears in a ballad in 1611. 

According to most medieval chroniclers, Queen Eleanor had been imprisoned by 1173 for raising her sons to be rebellious against their father, making a direct confrontation between the two women highly improbable.

Possible issue 
Historians are divided whether Clifford's relationship with Henry II produced children. Legends have attributed to her two of the king's illegitimate sons, Geoffrey, Archbishop of York (circa 1152 – 1212) and William Longespée, 3rd Earl of Salisbury (circa 1176 – 1226). However, Geoffrey was born before the king and Clifford even met from an otherwise unknown woman (possibly called Ykenai or Hikenai), and William was the son of Ida de Tosny, Countess of Norfolk (died after 1181).

Fair Rosamund's Well and Rosamund's Green 
According to local tales, "Rosamund's bower" (probably an early version of the labyrinth) was demolished when Blenheim Palace was built. Today, Fair Rosamund's Well is a paved spring in the park of Blenheim Palace in Woodstock, Oxfordshire. It is located to the south of the Grand Bridge on the western shore of The Lake, sometimes called Brown's Lake after 18th century landscape architect Capability Brown. According to a 2014 BBC article, "[T]he well had become 'somewhat overgrown and at risk of becoming damaged'".

Rosamund is also associated with the village of Frampton on Severn, Gloucestershire, another of her father's holdings. Walter de Clifford granted the mill there to Godstow Abbey for the good of the souls of his wife and daughter. The village green of Frampton became known as Rosamund's Green by the 17th century.

Rosa mundi rose 
A cultivated variation of rosa gallica with striped pink blooms is commonly known as rosa mundi. Its connection to Rosamund Clifford dates to the 16th century.

In fiction

In literature 

 The Complaint of Rosamund, a 1592 poem by Samuel Daniel;

 The Saint (German: Der Heilige), an 1879 novel by Conrad Ferdinand Meyer;
 Rosemonde, a 1913 poem by Guillaume Apollinaire.
 Eleanor the Queen is a 1955 novel by Norah Lofts
 Penmarric, a 1971 family saga by Susan Howatch (as Rose Parrish);
 The Courts of Love: The Story of Eleanor of Aquitaine, a 1987 novel by Jean Plaidy;
 The Falcon and the Flower, a 1988 romance novel by Virginia Henley;
 Wings of the Storm, a 1992 novel by Suzan Sizemore;
 Always, a 2000 novel by Lynsay Sands (mentioned);
 The Book of Eleanor, A Novel of Eleanor of Aquitaine, a 2002 novel by Pamela Kaufman;
 Time and Chance (2002) and Devil's Brood (2008), two novels by Sharon Kay Penman; 
 Death at Blenheim Palace, a 2006 novel by Robin Paige;
 The Death Maze (in the U.S.: The Serpent's Tale), a 2008 novel by Ariana Franklin;
 The Time of Singing, a 2008 novel by Elizabeth Chadwick (mentioned);
 The Captive Queen: A Novel of Eleanor of Aquitaine, a novel by 2010 by Alison Weir;
 The Winter Crown, a 2014 novel by Elizabeth Chadwick;
 La Révolte (The Revolt), a 2018 French novel by Clara Dupont-Monod.

In cinema 
 The Lion in Winter is a 1968 adaptaton of the play of the same name (alluded to).

In theatre 

 Henry II is a 1692 play by William Mountfort;
 The Lion in Winter is a 1966 play by James Goldman (alluded to).

In opera 
 Rosamond, a 1707 opera by Thomas Clayton to a libretto by Joseph Addison;
 Rosamond, a 1733 opera by Thomas Arne to Joseph Addison’s libretto;
 Rosamund, a 1780 German Singspiel by Anton Schweitzer to a libretto by Christoph Martin Wieland;
 Rosmonda d'Inghilterra ("Rosamund of England") is an 1834 Italian opera by Gaetano Donizetti;
 Fair Rosamond is an 1837 opera by John Barnett.

Notes

Sources
 Biography from Who's Who in British History (1998), H. W. Wilson Company. Who's Who in British History, Fitzroy Dearborn Publishers, 1998.
W. L. Warren, Henry II, 1973.
Remfry. P.M., Clifford Castle, 1066 to 1299

1140s births
1170s deaths
Burials in Oxfordshire
Mistresses of Henry II of England
12th-century English women
12th-century English people
Oxfordshire folklore